Julio Aguilar Azañón (17 September 1934 – 29 December 2000) was a Spanish politician from the UCD. He served as a member of the Congress of Deputies in its first legislature.

References

1934 births
2000 deaths
People from Albacete
Members of the 1st Congress of Deputies (Spain)
Union of the Democratic Centre (Spain) politicians